Kawale,(कावळे),Kavle,or Kawle, is a common surname in Maharashtra, India.

The surname is found in Hindu caste like Deshastha Brahmin, Maratha,  Lingayat,  Mang. Further, it has descended into various categories i.e. Teli,Kalar, Sonar, Bhandari, etc.

People with this surname are predominantly found in most of the major cities in Maharashtra like Mumbai, Pune, Satara Nashik, Nagpur, Solapur, Kolhapur, Aurangabad.

References 

Hindu surnames